Nurgush is a mountain range in Satkinsky District, western part of Chelyabinsk Oblast, Russian Federation.
The range is within the  protected area of the Zyuratkul National Park.

The name of the mountain in the Bashkir language means "luminous bird".

Geography
Nurgush is a subrange of the Urals. The range stretches between the southern shore of lake Zyuratkul to the mouth of river Berezyak. Maly Nurgush is the southern section. The southwestern limit of the range is marked by the valley of river Yuryuzan.

Flora
The lower slopes of the Nurgush are partly covered with dark coniferous taiga; there is mixed spruce, fir and birch forest in the valleys. The higher elevations have often a barren look with kurums and mountain tundra.

See also
List of highest points of Russian federal subjects
List of mountains and hills of Russia

References

External links

Khrebet Nurgush
Mountain ranges of Russia
Ural Mountains
Landforms of Chelyabinsk Oblast